Adnan Mahmoud Haidar (born 3 August 1989) is a professional football player and coach. A midfielder, he is a player-assistant coach for Norwegian club .

Born and raised in Norway, Haidar represented them at youth level internationally before switching allegiance for Lebanon at senior level. He represented Lebanon at the 2019 AFC Asian Cup.

Early life 
Haidar was born in Drammen, Norway and grew up in the capital Oslo, where he lived in the  neighborhood.

Club career

Vålerenga

2008 season 
Haidar played for 's youth sector until he joined Vålerenga's youth department in 2001. He signed a professional contract with the club in 2008, making his debut against Lyn on 15 September as a substitute. In total, Haidar made three appearances for Vålerenga in all competitions in the 2008 season, also winning the Norwegian Cup in his first season as a professional.

2009: Loan to Skeid 
In 2009, he was loaned out to Skeid for the entire season, where he made 11 appearances in the First Division.

2010 season 
He returned to Vålerenga for the 2010 season and scored his first and second ever senior goals for Vålerenga in his first game since returning from loan against Oppsal in the Norwegian Cup of 2010. He then played his first Tippeligaen game of the season against Start in an 8–1 win. He finished the season with six appearances and scoring two goals in all competitions.

2011 season 
In the 2011 season, he played ten games in the Tippeligaen, one game in the Norwegian Cup and one game in the UEFA Europa League before getting injured late into the season. It was later confirmed that Haidar had been ruled out for the rest of the season.

At the end of the season he was released by Vålerenga and became free agent, but before being released he was offered a new contract at Vålerenga but chose to reject the offer because he wanted more first team football. In total he made 21 appearances and scored two goals over three seasons for Vålerenga.

He later went to Burnley on trial, but returned without a contract. He rejected a new trial proposal at Burnley two weeks later.

Stabæk 
In January 2012, Haidar signed for Stabæk as a free agent, and was given the shirt number 10. He made his debut for Stabæk on the first day of the new season, on 25 March 2012 in a 0–0 draw against Aalesund.

Haidar stayed with Stabæk after the team was relegated to the First Division, and was a part of the team that won promotion to the Tippeligaen after only one season at the second tier. After the promotion was secured, Haidar was released from his contract and free to find himself a new club.

Return to Norway 
In summer 2021, Haidar joined Holmlia in the 4. divisjon. On 22 February 2022, he joined  as a player-assistant coach.

International career

Norway 
Haidar has represented Norway at youth international level: he played nine matches for the under-16s in 2005 and as seven matches for the under-19 in 2008.

Lebanon 
In October 2012, Haidar was called up to represent Lebanon, and made his debut for Lebanon in the friendly match against Yemen on 16 October. Haidar scored his first goal for Lebanon in the 2012 WAFF Championship match against Oman on 8 December 2012 when his team won 1–0.

In December 2018, Haidar was called up for the 2019 AFC Asian Cup squad; he played against North Korea in a 4–1 win, coming on as a 77th-minute substitute.

Style of play 
An all-round midfielder, Haidar is not only a physical presence on the pitch but also has good ball control.

Career statistics

Club

International 
Scores and results list Lebanon's goal tally first, score column indicates score after each Haidar goal.

Honours 
Vålerenga
 Norwegian Cup: 2008
 Tippeligaen runner-up: 2010

Ansar
 Lebanese Premier League runner-up: 2018–19
 Lebanese FA Cup runner-up: 2018–19
 Lebanese Elite Cup runner-up: 2019
 Lebanese Super Cup runner-up: 2017, 2019

Individual
 Lebanese Premier League Team of the Season: 2018–19

See also
 List of Lebanon international footballers
 List of Lebanon international footballers born outside Lebanon

References

External links

 Profile at the Norwegian Football Federation
 
 
 
 
 

1989 births
Living people
Norwegian people of Lebanese descent
Sportspeople of Lebanese descent
Sportspeople from Drammen
Lebanese footballers
Lebanese men's futsal players
Norwegian footballers
Norwegian men's futsal players
Association football midfielders
Vålerenga Fotball players
Skeid Fotball players
Stabæk Fotball players
Bryne FK players
Hamarkameratene players
Moss FK players
KFUM-Kameratene Oslo players
Al Ansar FC players
Holmlia SK players
Eliteserien players
Norwegian First Division players
Norwegian Second Division players
Norwegian Third Division players
Norwegian Fourth Division players
Lebanese Premier League players
Norway youth international footballers
Lebanon international footballers
2019 AFC Asian Cup players
Association football coaches